A listings magazine is a magazine which is largely dedicated to information about the upcoming week's events such as broadcast programming, music, clubs, theatre and film information.

The BBC's Radio Times was the world's first listings magazine when it was founded in 1923 to compete with daily newspapers, which had hitherto fulfilled the role. In 1932, New York's Cue was the first city-specific listings magazine.

With the expansion of broadcast media many others have followed, expanding the format to include columns about media production and personalities, such as TV Hebdo (Québec) in Canada, TV Guide in the US and hundreds of others worldwide. Broadcast guides are normally published either with a Saturday or Sunday newspaper or are published weekly or fortnightly.  It has become a highly competitive area of publishing.

Other listings magazines have started from a primary base in cultural events, such as Time Out magazine in the UK.  Most major cities worldwide have one or many more such publications.

During the politically charged 1970s and 1980s, many of these magazines, in the UK at least, played a progressive role as part of the alternative press and had a reputation for leftward leaning investigative and campaigning journalism. They were some of the first consumer magazines to carry lists of "agitprop" events. City Limits was probably the most outspoken of all UK-based listings magazines but almost all followed Time Out’s lead of including space for lesbian and gay events and clubs. In certain areas of the UK which were previously dominated by the old guard of regional newspapers, which were traditionally more conservative in outlook, this was the first time that gay issues were put on a par with others - this was particularly true of Bristol's Venue, Southampton's Due South Magazine, and to a lesser extent Manchester's City Life where the local press (Manchester Evening News) had been at times at least, a little more tolerant.

In Italy the most important listing magazine has always been TV Sorrisi e Canzoni, with a weekly circulation of over 2 million in the late 80s.

References

 
Magazine genres